Heinz Goldberg (1891–1969) was a German screenwriter. He also directed two silent films. Following the Nazi Party's rise to power in 1933, the Jewish Goldberg went into exile in several countries including Austria and the Soviet Union before settling in Britain. He returned to Germany in the 1950s.

Filmography
 Paganini (dir. Heinz Goldberg, 1923)
 The Money Devil (dir. Heinz Goldberg, 1923)
 Rags and Silk (dir. Richard Oswald, 1925)
 The Director General (dir. Fritz Wendhausen, 1925)
 The Elegant Bunch (dir. Jaap Speyer, 1925)
 A Woman with Style (dir. Fritz Wendhausen, 1928)
 The Little Slave (dir. Luise Fleck and Jacob Fleck, 1928)
 Children of the Street (dir. Carl Boese, 1929)
 The Last Company (dir. Curtis Bernhardt, 1930)
 Dreyfus (dir. Richard Oswald, 1930)
 (dir. Curtis Bernhardt and Jean Tarride, 1931)
 The Man Who Murdered (dir. Curtis Bernhardt, 1931)
 Stamboul (dir. Dimitri Buchowetzki, 1931)
El hombre que asesinó (dir. Dimitri Buchowetzki and Fernando Gomis, 1932)
 1914 (dir. Richard Oswald, 1931)
 Danton (dir. Hans Behrendt, 1931)
 Poor as a Church Mouse (dir. Richard Oswald, 1931)
 Distorting at the Resort (dir. Victor Janson, 1932)
  (dir. Herbert Selpin, 1932)
 The Love Contract (dir. Herbert Selpin, 1932)
  (dir. Herbert Selpin, 1932)
 Holzapfel Knows Everything (dir. Victor Janson, 1932)
 Unheimliche Geschichten (dir. Richard Oswald, 1932)
 Was sagt Onkel Emil dazu? (dir. Adolf E. Licho, 1932, short)
  (dir. Richard Oswald, 1933)
 The Flower of Hawaii (dir. Richard Oswald, 1933)
 A Song Goes Round the World (dir. Richard Oswald, 1933)
 Last Love (dir. Fritz Schulz, 1935)
 Heut' ist der schönste Tag in meinem Leben (dir. Richard Oswald, 1936)
 Merijntje Gijzens Jeugd (dir. Kurt Gerron, 1936)

References

Bibliography 
 Mitchell, Charles P. The Great Composers Portrayed on Film, 1913 through 2002. McFarland, 2004.
 Prawer, S.S. Between Two Worlds: The Jewish Presence in German and Austrian Film, 1910-1933. Berghahn Books, 2005.

External links 
 

Mass media people from Königsberg
1891 births
1969 deaths
German film directors
German male screenwriters
Jewish emigrants from Nazi Germany to the United Kingdom
20th-century German screenwriters